John Brett may refer to:
John Brett (artist) (1831–1902), British artist associated with the Pre-Raphaelite movement
John Brett (MP) for Much Wenlock
John Brett (chronicler) ( 1556), English author of Brett's Narrative, about the Marian exiles
John Brett (bishop) (died 1756), bishop of Elphin
John Brett (Royal Navy officer) (died 1785), Royal Navy admiral
John Aloysius Brett (1879–1955), administrator in British India
John Michael Brett, nom de plume of English author Miles Tripp (1923–2000)
John Watkins Brett (1805–1863), English telegraphic engineer
John Henry Brett (1835–1920), Irish architect, builder, and county surveyor

See also
Jack Brett (1917–1982), British motorcycle racer